Paolo Bartolozzi (12 September 1957 – 4 February 2021) was an Italian politician who served as a MEP.

References

1957 births
2021 deaths
Forza Italia MEPs
Forza Italia politicians
People from the Province of Florence